"Fight On, State" is the official fight song of The Pennsylvania State University. It is most widely known for being played by the Penn State Blue Band after scores at football games, and during the band's pregame show. It is written specifically to be played after a touchdown, as it slows down quickly toward the end of the song, then stops.  It then resumes after the team kicks an extra point and is played again at regular speed.

"New Fight On, State", known simply as "NFOS", is a shortened version of the song played without the slowdown and pause. It is the second fight song performed in the Penn State Blue Band's pregame show.  Written in 1968, "NFOS" takes the band out of a four-step interval block into a PSU formation on the field.  "NFOS" is performed two different ways during the pregame show.  During the transfer to the PSU formation, the band plays "NFOS short", which starts about halfway through the piece and continues to the end.  After the Floating Lions drill, the band plays "NFOS long", which is simply the entire piece.

Lyrics

See also
Penn State Alma Mater, official alma mater of The Pennsylvania State University
The Nittany Lion, traditional fight song of The Pennsylvania State University  played by the Blue Band during football games

External links
Mp3s of "Fight On, State" and "NFOS" at the Penn State Blue Band website

American college songs
College fight songs in the United States
Penn State Nittany Lions fight songs
1968 songs